Maxime Martin (born 20 March 1986) is a Belgian professional racing driver and son of four-time Spa 24 Hours winner Jean-Michel Martin. He currently is an Aston Martin Racing driver for which he competed in the FIA World Endurance Championship between 2018 and 2020. Martin had been a BMW factory driver since 2013, racing full-time in the American Le Mans Series for BMW Team RLL that season, as well as acting as BMW's DTM test and reserve driver. In late 2013 at BMW Motorsport's yearly review, Martin was confirmed as a full-time BMW DTM driver for the 2014 season.

Career

Born in Uccle, Martin finished fourth in 2006 in the Formula Renault 1.6 Belgium series. In 2007 he began racing in the Eurocup Mégane Trophy, finishing third overall with one victory. The following year he finished as runner-up, with six wins. He also won the French Renault Clio Cup title. In 2009 he raced mainly in the FIA GT3 European Championship for AutoGT Racing in a Morgan Aero 8, winning at Silverstone.

For 2010 Martin began racing in the new FIA GT1 World Championship for the Marc VDS Racing Team in a Ford GT. Along with teammate Bas Leinders he scored two podium finishes and ended the season 14th in the standings.  In 2011, Martin teamed with Frédéric Makowiecki to win 4 races, including both rounds at Ordos. Between 2011 and 2013 Martin raced in the Blancpain Endurance Series mainly driving a BMW Z4 GT3 also for the Marc VDS Racing Team. His best result came in 2012, where he finished runner-up together with his teammates Bas Leinders and Markus Palttala. In 2013 Martin also competed in the American Le Mans Series with BMW Team RLL in the all new BMW Z4 GTE. He and his team mate Bill Auberlen won in only the second race and finished 6th in the Drivers' standings.

In 2014 Martin made his debut in the DTM championship for BMW. He won a race at the Moscow Raceway, the first victory for a Belgian in the DTM. In 2015, he won another race, this time at the Nürburgring. In 2016, he only managed to finish twice on the podium, and ended the year winless. 2017 was his most successful season yet in the DTM, ending the season with one victory and four podiums.

In 2016 Martin won the Spa 24 Hours together with Alexander Sims and Philipp Eng, driving a BMW M6 GT3. By winning this race, he followed in the footsteps of his father Jean-Michel Martin, who won the race four times, and his uncle Philippe, who won twice alongside Jean-Michel.

In late 2017 Martin announced he would leave BMW after 5 years as a factory driver. He later announced he would join Aston Martin Racing as a factory driver to race in the 2018-19 FIA World Endurance Championship. In September 2020 Martin won the 24 Hours of Le Mans in the LMGTE Pro class together with Alex Lynn and Harry Tincknell for Aston Martin Racing. He took four more podiums during the season and finished runner-up in the Drivers' standings.

While Aston Martin Racing officially ended its factory involvement in the FIA WEC after the 2019-2020 season, Martin was retained  as a factory driver to support the customer racing program. However, due to a lack of opportunities in 2021 he raced on Porsche cars on several occasions. In 2022 Martin will race in the IMSA WeatherTech SportsCar Championship on an Aston Martin Vantage GT3 from The Heart of Racing Team. This marks his return to a full time program in North America for the first time since 2013. Martin ended up winning two races in the GTD class during the season, one of which was the 6 Hours of Watkins Glen, helping his teammate Roman De Angelis win the title. At the end of the season he and Aston Martin decided to part ways after five seasons.

Racing record

Complete GT1 World Championship results

Complete FIA GT Series results

‡ As Martin was a guest driver, he was ineligible for championship points.

Complete Blancpain GT Series Sprint Cup results

Complete 24 Hours of Le Mans results

Complete Deutsche Tourenwagen Masters results
(key) (Races in bold indicate pole position) (Races in italics indicate fastest lap)

Complete British GT Championship results
(key) (Races in bold indicate pole position) (Races in italics indicate fastest lap)

Complete FIA World Endurance Championship results
(key) (Races in bold indicate pole position; races in italics indicate fastest lap)

Complete 24 Hours of Daytona results

Complete IMSA SportsCar Championship results
(key) (Races in bold indicate pole position; results in italics indicate fastest lap)

* Season still in progress.

Complete 24H GT Series results

References

External links
 
 

Living people
1986 births
People from Uccle
Belgian racing drivers
French Formula Renault 2.0 drivers
FIA GT Championship drivers
Eurocup Mégane Trophy drivers
FIA GT1 World Championship drivers
24 Hours of Le Mans drivers
24 Hours of Daytona drivers
Rolex Sports Car Series drivers
American Le Mans Series drivers
FIA World Endurance Championship drivers
Blancpain Endurance Series drivers
International GT Open drivers
ADAC GT Masters drivers
WeatherTech SportsCar Championship drivers
Deutsche Tourenwagen Masters drivers
24 Hours of Spa drivers
British GT Championship drivers
Racing drivers from Brussels
Rowe Racing drivers
OAK Racing drivers
TDS Racing drivers
Aston Martin Racing drivers
Racing Bart Mampaey drivers
Rahal Letterman Lanigan Racing drivers
Belgian Formula Renault 1.6 drivers
R-Motorsport drivers
BMW M drivers
Porsche Motorsports drivers
KCMG drivers
Nürburgring 24 Hours drivers
Boutsen Ginion Racing drivers
24H Series drivers
W Racing Team drivers
GT4 European Series drivers